Exile is a British psychological thriller television series dealing with the topic of Alzheimer's disease against a background of corruption. It stars John Simm and Jim Broadbent and was broadcast on BBC One.  The series received varyingly positive reviews.

John Simm received a BAFTA nomination for his role as Tom Ronstadt, as did the director John Alexander.

Cast
 John Simm as Tom Ronstadt
 Jim Broadbent as Sam Ronstadt
 Olivia Colman as Nancy Ronstadt
 Claire Goose as Mandy Jackson
 Nico Mirallegro as Teenage Tom Ronstadt
 Shaun Dooley as Mike Eldridge
 Daryl Fishwick as Wendy Strawbridge
 Kate Magowan as Jane Dutton
 Timothy West as Metzler 
 Allan Corduner as Geller
 Abby Greenhalgh as Hayley Cousins
 John-Paul Hurley as Kevin Richardson
 Ned Dennehy as Ricky Llewelyn 
 Denise Black as Belinda Pocock
 Alex Clayton as Young Tom Ronstadt

Episodes

Reception 
In mostly positive reviews, script and performances were praised, with criticism directed toward clichéd elements of the story.  Reviewing the first episode, Amol Rajan of The Independent found the storytelling "glorious", and that "it engaged very directly with highly topical issues."  He stated that Broadbent confirmed "his position alongside Ian McKellen, John Hurt and Michael Gambon as one of the greatest English actors of his generation", and praised the "outstanding performances, from a bewitching John Simm (playing his son Tom) and the reliably wonderful Olivia Colman (his daughter Nancy)."

The Daily Telegraph referred to the series as "a powerful family drama trapped inside a clichéd tabloid thriller", and "so close to being brilliant. Instead, it was more of the same."  But the review praised the "magnificent performances by Broadbent as a man in the grip of Alzheimer's, and Olivia Colman as the daughter left alone to cope with it, seeing her life passing before her, and Simm's Tom driving back into their lives cursing the emptiness of his London media career [...]".

The Guardian review found "only a few missteps in Danny Brocklehurst's otherwise impeccable script", and part of the series "too pat", with "by-numbers triumphalism", but praised "the ingenious conceit of a mystery story in which the quest for the truth is foiled by an Alzheimer's sufferer catalysed a well-plotted drama, executed without exploitativeness and, in Simm's case, played more tenderly than I'd have thought him capable."

Radio Times' Alison Graham wrote, "A tremendous piece of drama; subtle, intelligent, powerful and adult. Writer Danny Brocklehurst and creator Paul Abbott have achieved something wonderful by blending a touching human story with a riveting thriller. This is as good as TV drama can be.. On every level Exile delivers."

Caitlin Moran, The Times, 7 May, On TV. "Danny Brocklehurst's script shamed most of his peers - keeping the dialogue real, yet without pouring out the can marked Genuine Real Northern Dialogue. Minute by minute this was exhilaratingly good television. It's hard to know at whom to throw the greatest plaudits. There wasn't a single thing wrong with this programme."

References

External links

BBC television dramas
2010s British drama television series
2011 British television series debuts
2011 British television series endings
BBC high definition shows
British thriller television series
2010s British television miniseries
English-language television shows
Television shows set in the United Kingdom